The Coogee Randwick Wombats are an Australian rugby league football team based in Coogee, New South Wales and Randwick, New South Wales a suburb of south-central Sydney and play in the South Sydney District Junior Rugby Football League.

Notable Juniors
Notable First Grade Players that have played at Coogee Randwick Wombats include:
Scott Wilson (1988–99 South Sydney Rabbitohs, North Sydney Bears, Canterbury Bulldogs, Gold Coast Chargers, Western Reds, North Queensland Cowboys)
Craig Wing (1998–09 South Sydney Rabbitohs & Sydney Roosters)
Ryan Cross (1998–06 Sydney Roosters)
Todd Byrne (2001–07 Sydney Roosters & New Zealand Warriors)
Michael Berne (2002 South Sydney Rabbitohs)
Reni Maitua (2003–13 Canterbury Bulldogs, Cronulla, Parramatta)
John Sutton (2004–19 South Sydney Rabbitohs)
Chris Enahoro (2004–05 South Sydney Rabbitohs)
Ryan Shortland (2007–08 Melbourne Storm & New Zealand Warriors)
Peter Betham (2008–15 Brumbies, NSW Waratahs, Rebels)
Jason Clark (2009–18 South Sydney Rabbitohs)
Blake Ayshford (2009–19 Wests Tigers, Cronulla Sharks, New Zealand Warriors).
Nathan Ross (2015–18 Newcastle Knights).
Campbell Graham (2017– South Sydney Rabbitohs)
Joseph Suaalii (2021– Sydney Roosters) 
Davvy Moale (2021– South Sydney Rabbitohs)

References

External links
 
 

Rugby league teams in Sydney
Rugby clubs established in 1953
1953 establishments in Australia
Coogee, New South Wales
Randwick, New South Wales